Odd Future Records was an American record label founded by rapper and producer Tyler, the Creator of Odd Future in 2011. It operated as a division of Sony Music Entertainment.

History
Odd Future Records was founded by Tyler, the Creator in 2011 
as a means to release material from the Odd Future collective. Despite this, members Earl Sweatshirt and Frank Ocean did not sign. Hardcore punk band Trash Talk signed in 2012.

Former artists

Discography

References

External links
 Official website

American record labels
Hip hop record labels
Record labels established in 2011
Vanity record labels
Tyler, the Creator